The Essential Alice in Chains is a two-disc compilation album by the rock band Alice in Chains, and part of Sony BMG's The Essential series. Originally scheduled to be released on March 30, 2004, it was delayed until September 5, 2006. The album was reissued in 2010 with different artwork. A DVD with the mockumentary The Nona Tapes came as a bonus disc with the compilation.

Overview
The third greatest hits release from the band, it proved to be more a definitive collection than the 10-track Greatest Hits collection and the best of/sampler collection, Nothing Safe: Best of the Box, featuring almost all of the band's hits and singles (with the exception of "Bleed the Freak", "Down in a Hole" "Fear the Voices" and "Don't Follow") as well as fan favorites and also two unplugged tracks. The songs "What the Hell Have I" and "A Little Bitter" which were featured on the Last Action Hero movie soundtrack are the Toby Wright remixed versions found on Music Bank. It is the band’s first release since the death of vocalist Layne Staley.

Track listing

Disc one

Disc two

Personnel
Alice in Chains
Layne Staley – lead vocals, backing vocals on "Grind", "Heaven Beside You" and "Over Now", rhythm guitar on "Angry Chair" and "Hate to Feel"
Jerry Cantrell – lead guitar, backing and co-lead vocals and sitar on "What the Hell Have I"
Mike Starr – bass (disc 1 and "Would?"), backing vocals (credited only on tracks 1–4)
Mike Inez – bass (disc 2, except "Would?"), additional backing vocals (tracks 1–4, 10,11), guitar (tracks 1–7, 10–11)
Sean Kinney – drums, percussion and piano on "Sea of Sorrow", additional backing vocals (tracks 1–4 on disc 1)

Additional personnel
Alice Mudgarden (performs "Right Turn")
Mark Arm – vocals on "Right Turn"
Chris Cornell – vocals on "Right Turn"
Ann Wilson - vocals on "Am I Inside"
April Acevez – viola on "I Stay Away"
Rebecca Clemons-Smith – violin on "I Stay Away"
Matthew Weiss – violin on "I Stay Away"
Justine Foy – cello on "I Stay Away"
Scott Olson – acoustic guitar on "Nutshell" and "Over Now"

Chart positions

Certifications

References

Alice in Chains compilation albums
2006 greatest hits albums
Columbia Records compilation albums